Stefano Nardelli (born 29 November 1993) is an Italian former professional cyclist.

Major results

2013
 4th Gran Premio della Liberazione
 9th Gran Premio di Poggiana
2014
 3rd Gran Premio Palio del Recioto
 7th Trofeo Alcide Degasperi
2015
 1st Gran Premio di Poggiana
 2nd Trofeo Città di San Vendemiano
 6th Overall Giro della Valle d'Aosta
 6th Trofeo Alcide Degasperi
 7th Trofeo Internazionale Bastianelli
 10th Coppa della Pace

References

External links
 
 

1993 births
Living people
Italian male cyclists
Sportspeople from Trento
Cyclists from Trentino-Alto Adige/Südtirol